The Kansas City Comets are an indoor soccer team based in Independence, Missouri, near Kansas City. Originally called the Missouri Comets, the team joined the Major Indoor Soccer League as an expansion team in the 2010–2011 season. They play their home games at the Cable Dahmer Arena and are currently members of the Major Arena Soccer League.

History
The team is named after the original Kansas City Comets, who played in the original Major Indoor Soccer League from 1981–1991. Kim Røntved, a former Kansas City Comets star, was named the head coach on August 16, 2010. Assistant Coach Vlatko Andonovski was promoted to Head Coach on August 29, 2013, succeeding Røntved.

Early years (2010–2013) 
The first couple of seasons saw the Missouri Comets establish themselves in the MISL. They finished third with an 8–12 record in 2010–11, falling to the Milwaukee Wave in three games in the playoffs. In 2011–12 the Comets finished second in the Central Division with a 15–9 record but were eliminated in the first round of the playoffs again by the Milwaukee Wave. The Comets finished 2012–13 in third place with a 13–13 record but made it all the way to the championship series, where the Baltimore Blast swept the series in two games.

In his first season as head coach, Vlatko Andonovski brought the Comets their first championship, defeating the Baltimore Blast in a three-game series in the final season of the MISL. In all four seasons as members of the MISL the Comets reached the playoffs, and won the championship on their fourth playoff appearance. This would be the final MISL championship.

Move to MASL (2014–present) 
After the 2013–2014 season, the team announced that it was leaving the MISL along with five other teams and join the MASL. In the debut season of the MASL in 2014–15 the Comets went undefeated with a 20–0 record, ending the regular season with a league-best 239 goals and a +149 goal differential, but were swept by the Baltimore Blast in the second round of the playoffs. The Comets won the following season's Central Division with a 17–3 record before falling once again to the Baltimore Blast in the postseason.

Before the 2016–17 season, the team announced that they would be rebranded as the Kansas City Comets. As Goran Karodzov took the reins as head coach, the Comets still managed to finish second in the Central with a 15–5 record before the Milwaukee Wave swept the first series in the playoffs. Following the 2016–17 season, the organization's future was in limbo.

With player turnover and the return of Kim Røntved as head coach, the Comets ended the 2017–18 season with a 7–12 record and missed the playoffs for the first time in franchise history. Røntved and the Comets returned in 2018–19 with greater improvements and the return of several veterans alongside former owner Brian Budzinski. In 2018–19 they returned to the playoffs with a 13–11 record in the South Central Division before being swept by the Milwaukee Wave in two games in the first round of the playoffs. Kansas City faced some inconsistent results throughout 2019–20 and were eliminated from playoff contention before the season was abandoned due to COVID-19, ending the season with a 10–11 record.

The Comets organization persevered throughout the COVID-19 pandemic to help host the first-ever MASL all-star game in December 2020. After the all-star game, the Comets claimed the first inaugural Central Cup championship with wins over the Dallas Sidekicks, St. Louis Ambush and Wichita Wings.

Year-by-year

Honors
MISL Champions: 2013–14
Central Division Champions: 2014–15, 2015–16, 2016–17
Central Cup Champions: 2020, 2021

Franchise leaders
Regular Season
Appearances: Leo Gibson (213)
Points: Leo Gibson (504)
Goals: Leo Gibson (259)
Assists: Leo Gibson (245)
Wins: Danny Waltman (63)
Saves: Danny Waltman (1,351)

Postseason
Appearances: Vahid Assadpour (34)
Points: Leo Gibson (40)
Goals: Leo Gibson (27)
Assists: John Sosa (17)
Wins: Danny Waltman (5)
Saves: Danny Waltman (172)

Total
Appearances: Leo Gibson (243)
Points: Leo Gibson (544)
Goals: Leo Gibson (286)
Assists: Leo Gibson (258)
Wins: Danny Waltman (68)
Saves: Danny Waltman (1,523)

Personnel
As of December 7, 2022.

Active players

Inactive players

Head coaches
 Kim Røntved (2010–2013)
 Vlatko Andonovski (2013–2016)
 Goran Karaotzov (2016—2017)
 Kim Røntved (2017—2019)
 Leo Gibson (2019—Present)

References

External links
Official Website

 
2010 establishments in Missouri
Association football clubs established in 2010
Independence, Missouri
Indoor soccer clubs in the United States
Major Arena Soccer League teams
Major Indoor Soccer League (2008–2014) teams
Soccer clubs in Kansas City, Missouri
Soccer clubs in Missouri
Sports in the Kansas City metropolitan area
Sports teams in the Kansas City metropolitan area